AM:PM Records was the dance division of A&M Records Ltd in the United Kingdom from 1994 to 1998, with Simon Dunmore as A&R.  In 1999, A&M's owner PolyGram merged with Universal Music Group, and the label ceased in 2002. AM:PM produced 11 UK top 40 hits including Ultra Naté's "Free", Mousse T's "Horny", Wamdue Project's "King of My Castle", Heller and Farley Project's "Ultra Flava", Smokin Beats' "Dreams", MJ Cole's "Sincere" and the 2000 release of K-Ci & JoJo's "Tell Me It's Real". The dance label of Universal, similarly named PM:AM Recordings, was launched in 2012 with releases by artists such as Afrojack, Tiesto and Avicii.

See also
 List of record labels

References

A&M Records
English record labels
English electronic dance music record labels
1994 establishments in England
2002 disestablishments in England
Defunct record labels of the United Kingdom